Heves is a small town in eastern Hungary. About 100 km east of Budapest, Heves lies at the northern extreme of the Great Hungarian Plain, just south of the Mátra and Bükk hills and west of the Tisza River. Heves gave its name to the Heves County, however it is not its seat and it is the fourth largest town in the county. The closest major city is Eger, which lies 40 km to the north. Heves is a significant transportation hub for the towns and agricultural areas of southern Heves County.

Demographics
Heves is home to approximately 11,000 residents. In addition to the ethnic Hungarian majority, there is a sizable Roma population.

Economy
The major sources of employment in Heves are agricultural and service-sector occupations.

Transport
Heves is served by a modern bus station near the centre of the town. The town is also served by a small train station 1 km from the town centre. Heves is located on a small train line (kis piros) that connects with major lines at Kál-Kápolna to the north and Kisújszállás to the south.

Education
Heves has a music school, a children's house and a high school (Eotvos Jozsef Kozepiskola). The high school is home to more than 1,000 students and is widely known for its police academy. Every year, the high school welcomes an English teacher from an English-speaking country to join the faculty for the school year.

Culture
The town welcomes an outdoor market every Wednesday and Saturday morning. Heves is well known for watermelons and hosts a watermelon festival each August.

Sights
The centre of the town is a scenic park with a chestnut-lined promenade, a gazebo, a fountain and numerous statues. A town museum and a 19th-century Catholic church stand at opposite ends of the park. A second museum (sakkmuzeum), one of the few chess museums in the world, is located not far from the park. Other recreational opportunities in Heves include a thermal bath, a community center that doubles as a theatre (kulturhaz) and the Aranykehely restaurant.

Other major civic institutions in Heves include a town hall, a town library and a folkart and handicraft cooperative.

Twin towns – sister cities

Heves is twinned with:
 Breganze, Italy
 Ciumani, Romania
 Miercurea Ciuc, Romania 
 Sulejów, Poland
 Tornaľa, Slovakia

Notable people
Lajos Hevesi (1843–1910), journalist and author
Antal Stevanecz (1861–1921), Slovene teacher and writer

References

External links

 in Hungarian, English, German, Russian and Chinese

Populated places in Heves County